Cretorhyssalus is an extinct genus of wasps which existed in what is now Russia during the Cenomanian age of the Late Cretaceous. It was described by Sergey A. Belokobylskij, and contains the species C. brevis.

References

Prehistoric Hymenoptera genera
Braconidae genera
Late Cretaceous insects
Insects described in 2012
Extinct animals of Russia
Protorhyssalinae